Djoemoe Airstrip , (also called  Djumu-Djomoe Airstrip) is an airstrip serving Djoemoe, Suriname.

Airlines and destinations 

Airlines serving this airport are:

Accidents and incidents
 On 29 October 1987 a Cessna U206F (PZ-NAU) was hijacked at the Djoemoe airstrip, Suriname, by members of the rebellion “Jungle Commando” of Ronnie Brunswijk. The pilot Dan Rogers returned to Paramaribo via French-Guyana after his release. In June 1988 the aircraft was returned to the MAF (Mission Aviation Fellowship) Suriname after mediation of MAF Headquarters in California, USA and French Guiana.

See also
 List of airports in Suriname
 Transport in Suriname

References

External links
OurAirports - Djumu-Djomoe
Djumu-Djomoe Airport
OpenStreetMap - Djumu-Djomoe

Airports in Suriname
Sipaliwini District